The PSL ("scoped semi-automatic rifle") is a Romanian military designated marksman rifle. It is also called PSL-54C, Romak III, FPK and SSG-97 (Scharfschützengewehr 1997). Though similar in appearance, mission, and specifications to the SVD Dragunov, the PSL rifle is, mechanically speaking, completely different as it is based on the AKM assault rifle - with its internals simply being scaled up to accommodate the more powerful 7.62×54mmR cartridge.

History
After Socialist Romania's refusal to join the Invasion of Czechoslovakia, relations with the Soviet Union worsened. To counterbalance its reliance on Soviet military equipment, Romania accelerated the development of its arms industry mostly relying on Soviet blueprints and licences. As the Soviets were not eager to share technical information on the SVD Dragunov, a project commenced to develop the PSL.

PSL rifles were originally made at the Uzina Mecanică Cugir in Cugir (English pronounced Koogeer), Romania starting with 1974. Great numbers were produced and equipped all branches of the Romanian Army, several internal troops and police units and the Gărzi Patriotice.  After a consolidation of military arsenals when Romania joined NATO, a split of the factory occurred, production of the PSL continues in Cugir under the brand SC Fabrica de Arme Cugir SA (ARMS arsenal), Romania.

The PSL rifle was designed to meet all the requirements of the SVD Dragunov. Its primary purpose is to be used by a squad level sniper, in current acceptance more of a designated marksman, to engage targets at ranges beyond the capabilities of the standard issue AKM assault rifles. It is built around a stamped steel receiver similar to that of the RPK light machine gun; having a wider forward section enabling a strengthened, more substantial front trunnion. The PSL's operation is the same long stroke piston action of the Kalashnikov family of weapons. Its appearance is similar to the Dragunov sniper rifle but they only share three components being the ammunition, optics, and bayonets.

Design
The PSL is chambered for the same venerable 7.62×54mmR (rimmed) cartridge as the Dragunov, and feeds from a ten-round detachable box magazine. The magazine used on the PSL differs from that of Dragunov models in that it is stamped with an X shaped pattern on the side, rather than the waffle style stamp found on the Russian and Chinese magazines. The magazines, though they are similar in shape and size, are not interchangeable between the Dragunov and PSL without modification.

The PSL has been in service in Romania since the 1970s and is widely sold on the world market. They are frequently encountered in Iraq where they appear to be quite popular. The simplicity of the rifle makes it ideal for soldiers to use and maintain. The action, being a variant of the AKM's, is extremely reliable despite lack of maintenance, and is particularly forgiving of sand and other debris. The scope's reticle pattern is easy to use and makes range estimation quick and reasonably accurate without any mathematical calculations necessary. With some simple instruction an average individual can be issued a PSL and successfully engage targets at ranges that far exceed the accurate capabilities of non-scoped assault rifles like the AKM, AK-47, etc. Accuracy varies greatly, however, between individual rifles to a greater extent to other rifles in its class, probably due to insufficient quality control during the manufacturing process. In the hands of a capable shooter and with quality ammunition such as 7N1 and 7N14 a PSL is capable of 1 Minute of angle (approximately 1" at 100 yards) or less while the rifles on the other end of the spectrum are only capable of about 3 MOA. The PSL has, however, gained notoriety due to bolt carriers cracking when used with heavy ball (147 grain or greater) ammo and silencers, in part thanks to the lack of adjustable gas. Aftermarket gas system upgrades (both PSL dedicated and retrofitted standard AK) have been known to solve the problem. Another, more risky, solution is to drill out the gas transfer port and fit a vented screw (which has a narrower vent diameter than the starting port size) inside.

PSL rifles have some notable features, the skeleton stock is somewhat similar to the Dragunov's but includes an interesting corrugated and spring-loaded stamped steel buttplate. When the rifle is fired this helps reduce the felt recoil to a degree. The cheek riser on the comb of the stock is angled to benefit the right-handed shooter primarily. Some owners feel the cheek pad is not high enough to adequately attain a rigid cheek weld and have to make do with a chin weld.

The butt stock is much shorter than most Western shooters are used to. This is because Romanian soldiers active during the Winter often operate in very cold climates and wear thick winter coats while on duty. In theory, a rubber stock extender is to be fitted during the hot Romanian summer, but one is not issued with the rifle.

LPS 4×6° TIP2 telescopic sight

The PSL's telescopic sight is made by the Romanian Optical Enterprise (IOR) in Bucharest. IOR is a Romanian company which has been making optics since 1936. They currently use German made Schott glass coated with the Carl Zeiss T-3 system to eliminate glare and maximize light transmission.  It is unknown what glass and coatings they used at the time they produced the PSL's scope, however IOR  had a long association with western European optics manufacturers and maintained these despite being caught within the Iron Curtain.  In 1967 IOR collaborated with various German manufacturers and in 1975 an association was established with Carl Zeiss which led to even more expansion and modernization.

The PSL was originally issued with the type 1 version of the LPS telescopic sight. This 4×24 scope was more or less identical to the Russian PSO-1 telescopic sight with a battery-powered reticle illumination and an IR detection filter. These scopes stopped being produced around 1974 and are rather rare today with collectors paying a premium for them. Shortly afterward the LPS scope was technically revised to simplify the maintenance and construction of the scope.

The PSL rifle is typically issued with a 4×24 optical sight called LPS 4×6° TIP2 (Lunetă Puṣcă Semiautomată Tip 2, or "Scope, Semi-Automatic Rifle, Type #2") which is a simplified version of the Russian PSO-1 telescopic weapon sight. This optical sight features 4× magnification, a 6° field of view, and the objective lens is 24 mm in diameter. It shares the basic design and stadiametric rangefinder found in the reticle of the original Russian PSO-1 scope. The LPS 4×6° TIP2 elevation turret features bullet drop compensation (BDC) in 50 m increments for engaging point and area targets at ranges from 100 m up to 1,000 m. The BDC feature must be tuned at the factory for the particular ballistic trajectory of a particular combination of rifle and cartridge at a predefined air density. Inevitable BDC induced errors will occur if the environmental and meteorological circumstances deviate from the circumstances the BDC was calibrated for. Marksmen can be trained to compensate for these errors. Besides the BDC elevation or vertical adjustment control of the reticle, the windage or horizontal adjustment control of the reticle can also be easily dialed in by the user without having to remove turret caps etc. The reticle illumination of the LPS 4×6° TIP2 is provided by (radioactive) tritium. The tritium light source has to be replaced every 8–12 years, since it gradually loses its brightness due to radioactive decay.

The LPS 4×6° TIP2 is issued with a lens hood that can be attached to the ocular to reduce/eliminate image quality impairing stray light and a covers to protect the objective external lens surface against foul weather and damage.

Mounting system

The LPS telescopic sight propriety mount is adjustable for tension on the LPS rifle's side rail. This side rail is a Warsaw Pact rail similar in design to the mounting used for Russian SVD rifles and PSO-1 optical sights and positions the telescopic sight axis to the left side in relation to the receiver and bore center axis. The Warsaw Pact mount has a castle nut that screws into the bottom of the locking lever. The spring-loaded portion of the clamp has to be pressed down to tighten or loosen the castle nut as needed.

The scope can be easily removed from the receiver of the rifle by swinging the locking lever open, then sliding the scope mount to the rear. This allows easy access to the receiver cover which needs to be removed for cleaning.

Due to the offset to the left and the relative height of the mounting, the PSL iron sights can be used with a LPS scope mounted, though the positioning of the scope's optical center axis may not be comfortable to all shooters.

Users

 
 
 
 
 

 Iraqi Kurdistan
 
 Anti-Gaddafi forces
 
 
 Contras
 
 

 
 : Used by Syrian Army.
 : Seen in the hands of Ukrainian government forces during the Second Battle of Donetsk Airport

Sporting version

A sporting version of the PSL, intended for export, is offered as the PSL-54C, Romak III, FPK, FPK Dragunov or SSG-97. This weapon is identical in almost every respect to the original military version of the PSL except for modifications to comply with the U.S. import laws regarding sporting rifles. These modifications include removal of the bayonet lug as well as the replacement of the original military receiver, which has three trigger mechanism axis pin holes instead of two. The third hole is for a safety sear that is thought to allow the rifle to be capable of being converted to "full-auto" by the end-user. US import versions are manufactured with a BATFE approved semi-auto Romanian receiver. The so-called "third hole" is not present, thus the trigger mechanism is simplified and omits the "full auto" safety sear. The military spec FPK is not capable of fully automatic fire however it includes this safety sear to ensure the rifle's hammer cannot be released before the bolt is fully forward and locked in place in the forward trunnion. Because of this fact, and the lack of a spring-loaded firing pin, there is some theoretical potential that the US legal PSL could fire out of battery (before the bolt is fully locked). The US commercial-spec rifles also sometimes omit the bolt hold-open mechanism that is on the true military spec rifles.

All sporting versions of the PSL are constructed using original Romanian parts and assembled either in Romania or in the United States, some using American made receivers. Examples of the commercial sporting version were also available (on a very limited production run) in the 7.62×51mm NATO (.308 Winchester) cartridge as opposed to the 7.62×54mmR mm these rifles are typically chambered for. A PSL with a 16" barrel was also marketed as the FPK Paratrooper, but no such rifle exists within the Romanian military, being purely a US made variant. These rifles were primarily imported by Century Arms International, InterOrdnance, and Tennessee Gun Importers (TG Knox).

Gallery

See also
Dragunov sniper rifle
Galil Sniper
Zastava M76
Zastava M91
List of sniper rifles

References

Bibliography
 Ezell, E (1983) Harrisburg, PA: Stackpole Books, p. 637. 
 Günter Wollert;  Reiner Lidschun;  Wilfried Kopenhagen, Illustrierte Enzyklopädie der Schützenwaffen aus aller Welt : Schützenwaffen heute (1945–1985), Berlin : Militärverlag der Deutschen Demokratischen Republik, 1988. 
 Rottman, Gordon; Shumate, Johnny: Kalashnikov AK-47 Assault Rifle, Osprey Publishing, 2011,

External links

 Dragunov.net: Romanian PSL
 anca.com.ro/pusca-semiautomata-762mm-cu-luneta Romanian Association of Arms Collectors article
 Website by "Tantal" which describes proper method for adjusting the PSO type scope clamps
 Video of person shooting a PSL
 Video showing how to adjust PSO scope

7.62×51mm NATO rifles
7.62×54mmR semi-automatic rifles
Designated marksman rifles
Rifles of the Cold War
Infantry weapons of the Cold War
Rifles of Romania
Romania–Soviet Union relations
Military equipment introduced in the 1970s